The Englewood race riot, or Peoria Street riot, was one of many post-World War II race riots in Chicago, Illinois that took place in November 1949.

Whites in the neighborhood rioted, attacking other whites, partially based on rumors and misinformation that blacks were meeting to take over their neighborhood.

Origin

According to labor historian Rick Halpern the U.P.W.A (United Packing Workers of America) were holding an interracial union meeting at the home of Aaron Bindman (a member of the CIO's longshoremen's union), Louise Bindman and Bill and Gussie Sennett.  The neighbors were disturbed by the presence of the attending black shop stewards and insisted they leave the area, and when Bindman refused this request two days of rioting began.  Although one hundred policeman were on the scene, the crowd almost destroyed Bindman's home.  This is a very interesting and perhaps overlooked flash point in the history of the civil rights movement because it marks a place where the struggles of labor moved beyond the plants and into the larger community where it joined forces with other activist organizations.  Indeed the UPWA quickly emerged at the forefront of community wide mobilization.  They publicized and formed a committee that brought considerable pressure to bear upon Mayor Kennelly, who flatly refused to make any statement about the disturbance, demanding that he ensured adequate police protection.  A well-publicized move to research mayoral impeachment prompted Kennelly to issue a statement and meet with the commissioner of police.  The committee also help expose the exploitative practices of banks and real estate companies that were promoting and profiting from "white flight."

The origin of the race riots in Chicago was blacks moving into the neighborhood. In Englewood this took place on the basis of a rumor. Supposedly the house at 5643 S. Peoria St. was going to be bought by a black. 
This rumor was false, but it nonetheless triggered racial upheaval of white nationalists.

The riot
Hundreds of whites gathered outside the home where the meeting was being held on the night of November 8. At about 9:30 p.m., a young boy threw a rock at house and others in the crowd followed. The rioting lasted for five days, with police doing little to stop the violence and even encouraged more violence at times. Whites in the neighborhood beat blacks and white people whom they believed to be outsiders or communists. At least thirteen people were beaten severely enough to be in hospital.

Size and form
At first there were some several hundred rioters. This rose to a peak of up to 10,000 rioters. The white residents did not want blacks to be in their community and also cried out against Jews and Communists being allegedly involved. It was alleged that a local Catholic parish was responsible for organizing the gangs behind the violence.

See also 
 Airport Homes race riots
 Fernwood Park race riot
 List of incidents of civil unrest in the United States

References

1949 in Illinois
1949 riots
Antisemitism in Illinois
White American riots in the United States
African-American history in Chicago
Anti-communism in the United States
Antisemitic attacks and incidents in the United States
Urban decay in the United States
Riots and civil disorder in Chicago
History of racism in Illinois